H1-Key (read as High-key; stylized as H1-KEY) is a South Korean girl group formed and managed by Grandline Group (GLG) and Sony Music Entertainment Korea. The group is composed of four members: Seoi, Riina, Hwiseo and Yel. Sitala left the group on May 25, 2022, and Hwiseo was introduced as a new member on June 14, 2022. They made their debut with the release of their first single album, Athletic Girl, on January 5, 2022.

Name 
Their group name H1-Key is pronounced and inspired by the word High Key and the aim for confident and healthy beauty.

History

Pre-debut activities and introductions 
Yel was a trainee under JYP Entertainment. Riina was previously training under WM Entertainment. Sitala, daughter of the late Thai actor, singer and producer Sarunyoo Wongkrachang, is a former trainee under Lionheart Entertainment. Seoi was a trainee under YG Entertainment. 

On November 18, 2021, Naver News revealed that Grandline Group (GLG), the newly-established sub-label of the now defunct hip-hop based label Grandline Entertainment (GRDL), were planning to debut a new girl group on January 5, 2022. On November 20, 2021, the group opened their official social media accounts.

On November 23, 2021, Yel was announced as the group's first member through a self-choreographed cover video of "Bad Habits" by Ed Sheeran. On November 26, 2021, Seoi was introduced as the group's second member. On November 29, Riina, a former Produce 48 contestant and WM Ggumnamu member, was revealed as the third member. On November 30, Sitala, was introduced as the group's fourth member. Later the members made their first full group appearance in a dance cover video for the song "Me So Bad".

Controversy around Sitala 
When GLG unveiled the group's Thai member Sitala in November 2021, various K-pop fans in Thailand called for her removal, as her late father was a known supporter of the country's military tyranny that ousted two democratic-elected civilian governments in the 2006 and 2014 military coup d'état. In response to the backlash, GLG issued a statement on December 8 saying: "We cannot hold Sitala at risk for what her father did within the past, as his activities were past her obligation. Sitala could be a courteous and dedicated individual, whose objective is to improve Thailand's national glory. If it's not too much trouble support her so that she can do something for her country".

2021–2022: Debut with Athletic Girl, Sitala's departure and Run 
On December 21, 2021, via H1-Key's Social media accounts, it was announced with a promotion schedule that they will make their debut with the first single album, Athletic Girl, with the title track of the same name. Prior to the release, it was announced that the group would be partnering with Sony Music for international promotions. 

The album was released on January 5, 2022. They held a press showcase for the album on the same day. H1-Key made their broadcast debut on January 7, 2022, at KBS2's Music Bank.

On May 25, 2022, GLG announced that Sitala had left the group due to personal circumstances.

On June 7, it was announced that the quartet would be releasing their first maxi single album titled Run on July 6, with the addition of a new member, Hwiseo. On December 6, 2022, H1-Key confirmed their comeback on January 5, 2023, the anniversary of their debut.

2023: Rose Blossom 
On December 6, 2022, It was announced that the quartet's first extended play titled Rose Blossom would be released on January 5, 2023, the anniversary of their debut.

Members

Current 
 Seoi – leader, vocalist
 Riina – vocalist
 Yel – vocalist, rapper
 Hwiseo – vocalist, rapper

Former 
 Sitala – rapper, vocalist

Discography

Extended plays

Single albums

Singles

Videography

Music video

Awards and nominations

Notes

References 

2022 establishments in South Korea
K-pop music groups
Musical groups established in 2022
South Korean girl groups
Musical groups from Seoul
South Korean dance music groups
South Korean pop music groups